Brentford Football Club is an English professional football club based in Brentford, Hounslow, London. Between 1892 and 1920, the first team competed in the West London Alliance, West London League, London League, Southern League and Western League. Since 1920, the first team has competed in the Football League, the Premier League and other nationally and internationally organised competitions.

The 1932–33 and 1934–35 Third Division South and Second Division title-winning seasons yielded 2.10 and 2.07 points per game respectively, while the 94 points accumulated during the 2013–14 second-place finish in League One is Brentford's record points total. Prior to achieving promotion to the Premier League via the Championship play-offs in 2021, Brentford's nine failed attempts to gain promotion through the EFL play-offs was a national record.

Brentford has never won a major cup, with the club's furthest advancement being the semi-final of the EFL Cup (2020–21) and the quarter-finals of the FA Cup (1937–38, 1945–46, 1948–49, 1988–89). The club has reached three EFL Trophy finals (1985, 2001, 2011) and finished as runners-up on each occasion. In 1992–93, the club reached the semi-finals of the Anglo-Italian Cup on its only entry into the competition.

Key 

Pld = Matches played
W = Matches won
D = Matches drawn
L = Matches lost
GF = Goals for
GA = Goals against
Pts = Points
Pos. = Final position
QR2 = Second qualifying round

QR3 = Third qualifying round
QR4 = Fourth qualifying round
QR5 = Fifth qualifying round
QR6 = Sixth qualifying round
IR = Intermediate qualifying round
R1 = First round
R1S = Southern area first round
R2 = Second round
R2S = Southern area second round

R3 = Third round
R4 = Fourth round
R5 = Fifth round
QF = Quarter-finals
QFS = Southern area quarter-finals
GrpS = Southern area group stage
SFS = Southern area semi-finals
FS = Southern area finals

Seasons 
Correct as of the end of the 2021–22 season. For information on the season in progress, see 2022–23 Brentford F.C. season.

Notes

References
General

Specific

Seasons
Seasons
 
Brentford